Alienator is a 1990 science fiction film directed by Fred Olen Ray, produced by Jeffrey C. Hogue, and starring Jan-Michael Vincent.

The film was described by Leonard Maltin and confirmed by Fred Olen Ray to be a "semi-remake" of the 1957 film The Astounding She-Monster. Robert Clarke, who starred in that film, also appears in Alienator.

Plot
Kol, an alien criminal, escapes from a spaceship into the woods of an American suburb. The commander of the spaceship dispatches "the Alienator"—a deadly gynoid, to capture Kol. She relentlessly pursues Kol and a group of teenagers whom he meets up with.

Cast
 Jan-Michael Vincent as Commander  
 John Phillip Law as Ward Armstrong  
 Ross Hagen as Kol  
 Teagan Clive as Alienator
 Dyana Ortelli as Orrie  
 Jesse Dabson as Benny  
 Dawn Wildsmith as Caroline  
 P. J. Soles as Tara  
 Robert Clarke as Lund  
 Richard Wiley as Rick  
 Leo Gordon as Col. Coburn  
 Robert Quarry as Doc Burnside  
 Fox Harris as Burt  
 Hoke Howell as Harley  
 Jay Richardson as Prison sergeant major  
 Dan Golden as Electrocuted prisoner
 Joseph Pilato as Tech #2

Release
Alienator was originally set for release between May and August in 1989. Prism Entertainment announced in November 1989 to release the film along with Time Troopers in late December. Prism later released the film on February 8, 1990.

On March 19, 2013, the film was released on DVD by Shout! Factory as part of a two-disc "Action-Packed Movie Marathon" set, which contains a total of four films. On June 13, 2017, the film was released on Blu-ray by Scream Factory, featuring a commentary track by director Fred Olen Ray.

Reception
From contemporary reviews, "Lor." of Variety reviewed the AIP video cassette on November 18, 1989. "Lor." declared the film to be a "tongue-in cheek sci-fi thriller geared towards home video fans with a soft spot for the old stars and old-fashioned serials." "Lor." noted the film "suffers from a weak script" that gave Jan-Michael Vincent and John Phillip Law little to do while P.J. Soles is "stuck in a rather goofy costume as an outer space technician".

See also
 Cyborgs in fiction

References

Sources

External links 
 
 

1990 films
1990 action thriller films
1990 independent films
1990s science fiction action films
American independent films
American science fiction action films
American action thriller films
Android (robot) films
Films directed by Fred Olen Ray
1990s English-language films
1990s American films